Dihammaphora gutticollis' is a species of beetle in the family Cerambycidae. It was described by Gounelle in 1913.

References

Dihammaphora
Beetles described in 1913